The Cordillera Azul antbird (Myrmoderus eowilsoni) is a species of passerine bird in the family Thamnophilidae. It has been found only in the Cordillera Azul, San Martín Region, Peru where its natural habitat is humid montane forest.

The species was described in 2018 by Andre Moncrieff and colleagues and given the binomial name Myrmoderus eowilsoni. The specific epithet was chosen to honour the American naturalist Edward Osborne Wilson.

References

Cordillera Azul antbird
Birds of the Peruvian Amazon
Endemic birds of Peru
Cordillera Azul antbird
Cordillera Azul antbird